Cawgay (or Chowgay) is a town in Zabul Province, Afghanistan. About 1,652 people live there.

References

Populated places in Zabul Province